Hartland, also known as the Rodgers Farm, is a historic home located near Lewisburg, Greenbrier County, West Virginia. The original section was built about 1800, with the two story log addition built sometime after 1812.  A third section of similar size to the second was added before 1860. About 1895, a fourth addition was built.  In 1912, a porch was added.

It was listed on the National Register of Historic Places in 1975.

References

Houses on the National Register of Historic Places in West Virginia
Houses in Greenbrier County, West Virginia
National Register of Historic Places in Greenbrier County, West Virginia
Houses completed in 1800
Log buildings and structures on the National Register of Historic Places in West Virginia